Gloria Farrell (born 1954) is a Trinidadian former cricketer who played primarily as a bowler. She played 5 One Day Internationals for International XI at the 1973 Women's Cricket World Cup, taking 6 wickets at an average of 20.33. She played domestic cricket for Trinidad and Tobago.

References

External links
 
 

1954 births
Living people
Trinidad and Tobago women cricketers
West Indian women cricketers
International XI women One Day International cricketers